Etulo (Utur, Turumawa) is an Idomoid language of central Nigeria.

Distribution
Etulo is spoken in:
Katsina-Ala LGA, Benue State
Wukari LGA, Taraba State

References

Idomoid languages